The Jask-2 missile is an Iranian submarine-launched cruise missile developed from the Iranian Nasr-1 Anti-ship missile. It is designed to be fired from the Ghadir-class midget submarines and it can also be launched by the Fateh-class submarines.

History
According to some sources the missile was first displayed as a model in an exhibition by students of the Imam Khomeini Naval University of Noshahr in September 2012. In May 2017, the Iranians reportedly tested the Jask-2 cruise missile for the first time, however the tests failed. On 25 February 2019, the Iranians successfully tested the missile as part of the Velayat 97 maneuvers and released a footage of the missile being fired from a Ghadir-class submarine, Iran also modified the Fateh-class submarines so that they can also launch cruise missiles. By 11 September 2020, a Navy official claimed the Jask-2 cruise missiles had been mass produced (with such efforts starting in November 2019). Hossein Khanzadi also said that Iran wishes to extend the range of the Jask-2 missile and work is being done on the Jask-3 missile.

Characteristics
The missile is speculated to be encapsulated in a torpedo. with its own marine propulsion which allows it to swim out of a submarine's torpedo tube in a way conventional missiles can not, the missile's light weight, size and negative buoyancy allows it to do so making the missile somewhat unique as compared to other submarine launched cruise missiles. The missile separates from the torpedo once the missile leaves the sea. The missile has a range of just  and a length of >.

See also

Other Iranian anti-ship missiles
Hormuz
Khalij Fars
Qader
Nasr-e Basir
Ghadir

Other SLCMs
Babur
P-700 Granit
3M-54 Kalibr

References 

Cruise missiles of Iran
Anti-ship missiles of Iran
Guided missiles of Iran
Anti-ship cruise missiles of Iran
Military equipment introduced in the 2010s